Nottle may refer to:

Ed Nottle, minor league baseball relief pitcher and manager
Gussie Fink-Nottle, fictional character in the Jeeves novels